Love and Trumpets is a 1925 German silent comedy film directed by Richard Eichberg and starring Lilian Harvey, Harry Liedtke, and Harry Halm. It was shot at the Johannisthal Studios in Berlin. The film's sets were designed by the art director Kurt Richter.

Cast

References

Bibliography

External links

1925 films
1925 comedy films
German comedy films
Films of the Weimar Republic
German silent feature films
Films directed by Richard Eichberg
Films shot at Johannisthal Studios
German black-and-white films
Silent comedy films
1920s German films